Lawrence Stephen McMahon (December 26, 1835 – August 21, 1893) was a Canadian-born prelate of the Catholic Church. He served as Bishop of Hartford from 1879 until his death in 1893.

Biography
Lawrence McMahon was born in St. John, New Brunswick to Owen and Sarah McMahon, and in 1839 came with his parents to the United States, where they settled in Charlestown, Boston, Massachusetts. His younger brother John later became pastor of St. Mary's, Charlestown Receiving his early education at the public schools of Boston, he entered Holy Cross College in Worcester at age 15, and remained there until the college was destroyed by fire in 1852. He then studied rhetoric at the Collège de Montréal, Quebec, and philosophy at St. Mary's Seminary in Baltimore, Maryland. 

Bishop John Bernard Fitzpatrick of Boston had arranged for McMahon to study at the Pontificio Collegio Urbano de Propaganda Fide, but given the political unrest in Italy at that time, McMahon changed plans and went to the College of Aix in France where he studied theology for three years. He then went to the French Seminary of Santa Clara in Rome while attending lectures at the Apollinaire,. He was ordained to the priesthood on March 24, 1860.

McMahon was first assigned as a curate at Holy Cross Cathedral in Boston, and served as chaplain to the 28th Massachusetts regiment during the Civil War from 1863 to 1865. Returning from the war, he served as pastor in Bridgewater and then in New Bedford, where he erected St. Lawrence's Church and a hospital under the care of the Sisters of Mercy. He was also named the first vicar general of the Diocese of Providence, Rhode Island, in 1872.

On May 16, 1879, McMahon was appointed the fifth Bishop of Hartford, Connecticut, by Pope Leo XIII. He received his episcopal consecration on August 10 from Archbishop John Joseph Williams, with Bishops John Loughlin and Patrick Thomas O'Reilly serving as co-consecrators, at Hartford. He soon liquidated the diocese's $60,000 debt, and continued to execute the building plans of his predecessors for the Cathedral of St. Joseph, which he dedicated in May 1892. His brother would use the same architect, Patrick Keely, and sculptor Joseph Sibbel in the construction of his church in Charlestown.  

During his 14-year tenure, he established 48 parishes and 16 parochial schools.

McMahon later died at Lakeville, aged 57. He is buried in the Bishop's Plot at Mount St. Benedict Cemetery in Bloomfield, Connecticut.

References

External links
Roman Catholic Archdiocese of Hartford
 photo of Bishop McMahon

1835 births
1893 deaths
19th-century Roman Catholic bishops in the United States
Roman Catholic bishops of Hartford
Pre-Confederation Canadian emigrants to the United States
Catholic Church in Connecticut
College of the Holy Cross alumni
Clergy from Boston
Union Army chaplains
Pre-Confederation New Brunswick people
Burials in Connecticut
Religious leaders from Connecticut